Carbactinoceras is a genus of Early  Carboniferous (Visean) actincoceroids first found in Europe (Germany) related to Rayonnoceras but probably smaller.

Description
Carbactinoceras shells are straight and generally unknown beyond the early growth stage. The siphuncle is large, central to subcentral; segments inflated, septal necks cyrochoantiic and recumbent. The endosiphuncular canal system observed is well developed with thin radial canals perpendicular to the central canal, and leading to a narrow seam along the connecting rings called a perispatium.

Taxonomic position
Although Carbactinoceras had been considered an actinocerid according to the American Teatise Part K, 1964, based on the internal characters of the siphuncle, the initial chambers of the phragmocone indicate that  this genus is an actinoceroid homeomorph (lookalike) belonging phylogenetically to the Pseudorthocerida

References

 Bjorn Kroger 2007.  Carboniferous Actinoceratoid Nautiloidea (Cephalopoda) - a new perspective) . Journal of  Paleontology, July 2007
 Curt Teichert, 1964. Actinoceratoidea. Treatise on Invertebrate Paleontology, Part K. Geological Society of America and University of Kansas Press.
Carbactinoceras Paleobiology Database
J.J. Sepkoski 2002. List of Cephalopod genera. 

Orthoceratoidea
Prehistoric nautiloid genera
Carboniferous cephalopods
Carboniferous animals of Europe
Carboniferous Germany
Carboniferous first appearances
Carboniferous extinctions
Fossil taxa described in 1935